This is a list of people who have served as Custos Rotulorum of the East Riding of Yorkshire.

 Sir William Babthorpe bef. 1544–1555
 Christopher Estoft bef. 1558–1566
 John Vaughan bef. 1573–1577
 Ralph Rokeby 1577 – aft. 1584
 Thomas Knyvet, 1st Baron Knyvet bef. 1594 – aft. 1608
 Sir William Constable, 1st Baronet bef. 1621–1626
 Sir William Alford 1626 – aft. 1636
 Sir William Strickland, 1st Baronet 1642–1646
Interregnum
Sir John Hotham, 2nd Baronet 1660–1680
John Sheffield, 3rd Earl of Mulgrave 1680–1682
Charles Seymour, 6th Duke of Somerset 1682–1687
John Sheffield, 3rd Earl of Mulgrave 1687–1689
Thomas Osborne, 1st Duke of Leeds 1689–1699
John Holles, 1st Duke of Newcastle 1699–1711
Peregrine Osborne, 2nd Duke of Leeds 1711–1715
Rich Ingram, 5th Viscount of Irvine 1715
Richard Boyle, 3rd Earl of Burlington 1715–1721
William Pulteney 1721–1728
For later custodes rotulorum, see Lord Lieutenant of the East Riding of Yorkshire.

References
Institute of Historical Research - Custodes Rotulorum 1544-1646
Institute of Historical Research - Custodes Rotulorum 1660-1828

Yorkshire